Lucien Samaha is a Lebanese-American photographer and artist based in New York City.

Life and career
Samaha was born in Beirut, and emigrated to the US in 1970. He attended Annandale High School and Rochester Institute of Technology. He was a Flight Attendant with Trans World Airlines from 1978 to 1986. In 1990, he was the recipient of the first Eastman Kodak Company Professional Photography Division Scholarship ever given to a photographer and later joined the Eastman Kodak Company. He was one of the original members of the Arab Image Foundation.

Exhibitions

Solo exhibitions

 2008: Uneasy About Beirut, Sara Tecchia Roma New York, New York, USA
 2013: The Flight Attendant Years: 1978-1986, Lombard Freid Projects, New York, USA
 2016: The Actor's Shadow, Sibiu City Hall, Romania
 2016: The Solitude of Modern Man as Portrayed in Contemporary Cinema, Transilvania International Film Festival, Romania
 2019: A History of Digital Photography, Pioneer Works, New York, USA

Group exhibitions
 2008: Good is What Pleases, Museum für Moderne Kunst, Frankfurt, Germany
 2006: Persona-Personae, Sara Tecchia Roma New York, New York, USA
 2006: I Want To Show You Somewhere, Douglas F. Cooley Memorial Art Gallery, Oregon, USA
 2007: The Searchers, EFA Gallery, New York, USA
 2018: Beirút, Beyrut, Beyrouth, Beyrout, Oslo Kunstforening, Oslo, Norway

References

External links 
 

American photographers
Lebanese American
Rochester Institute of Technology alumni
1958 births
Living people
Annandale High School alumni